Attila Fritz (born 17 July 1986) is a Hungarian football player who currently plays for Szolnoki MÁV FC.

Club career

Budapest Honved
He made his debut of 15 March 2008 against Pécsi Mecsek FC in a match that ended 2–1.

Club honours

Budapest Honvéd FC 
Hungarian Cup:
Winner: 2008–09
Runners-up: 2007–08
Hungarian Super Cup:
Runners-up: 2007, 2009

References 
HLSZ
football squads

1986 births
Living people
Footballers from Budapest
Hungarian footballers
Association football midfielders
Budapest Honvéd FC II players
Budapest Honvéd FC players
Hévíz FC footballers
Vecsés FC footballers
Szolnoki MÁV FC footballers
Nemzeti Bajnokság I players